Athletics events were contested at the 1987 Summer Universiade in Zagreb, SR Croatia, SFR Yugoslavia between 13 and 19 July.

Medal summary

Men's events

Women's events

Medal table

See also
 1987 in athletics (track and field)

References
World Student Games (Universiade - Men) - GBR Athletics
World Student Games (Universiade - Women) - GBR Athletics

 
Athletics at the Summer Universiade
Uni
1987 Summer Universiade
1987 Universiade